Ian Gillett (20 September 1928 – 28 February 2008) was an Australian rules footballer who played with South Melbourne in the VFL during the 1950s. 

Gillett was a ruckman but was also capable of playing the key positions. He was South Melbourne's leading goalkicker in 1953 and won the Best and Fairest award in 1956.

Gillett was captain-coach of Coolamon Football Club from from 1959 to 1963 and steered them to a premiership in 1959.

Gillett was captain of the South West Football League (New South Wales) representative team that won the 1964 VFCL Country Championships.

References

External links

1928 births
Australian rules footballers from Victoria (Australia)
Sydney Swans players
Bob Skilton Medal winners
2008 deaths